The discography of British singer Nicola Roberts consists of one studio album, three singles, and three music videos.

In the 2008 biography of Girls Aloud, Roberts expressed an interest in writing and recording her own material, wanting to experiment in the studio for better understanding of the process. She then started work in the recording studio, with producers such as; Dragonette, Diplo and Joseph Mount. Roberts after a year of recording announced that she would be releasing her debut album, Cinderella's Eyes. The first single "Beat of My Drum" had an on-sale release meaning it had little promotion beforehand and commercially it peaked at number 27 in the United Kingdom but critically it garnered acclaim from critics which Roberts described as "amazing".

A second single "Lucky Day" was released shortly after and whilst gaining positive reviews it failed to make an impact commercially peaking at number 40 in the UK. The album was then released on 23 September 2011, Roberts described the album as "electronically lead", and the album was inspired by her time performing with Girls Aloud - "It would have been stupid for me to make an album that meant nothing" she said. For Roberts the album was about making a risky record, where there wasn't a guaranteed commercial success, explaining to The Guardian: "It's taken every last bit of confidence just to release this record, or maybe I've just brainwashed myself into feeling more confident. I don't know if it's good, or if I've just told myself it's good."

The album was released to universal positive reviews from critics, reviewers such as Ludovic Hunter-Tilney of the Financial Times, James Lachno of The Daily Telegraph, Emily Mackay of NME, Hugh Montgomery of The Independent and others hailed it as the best solo record from a member of Girls Aloud. Commercially in the United Kingdom the album peaked at number 17 whilst on the digital charts it peaked at number 13, in Scotland it charted at number 21 whilst in Ireland it peaked at number 48. On 6 January a third single from the album was released, titled "Yo-Yo". The song was described as a "shining example of her pop sensibilities".

In October 2011, Roberts stated that she is working on creating music and is ‘happy’ for other artists to use tracks that didn’t make the cut on her solo album. On 13 January 2012, Roberts commented on the possibility of a second album, saying, "Maybe. I'm not sure. There's lots of stuff coming up and I think there always has to be a right time. I'm always working on music and if a second album came out then that would be a great thing to happen." In October 2017, Roberts stated that she would begin to work more on her own music, as well as other artists. In February 2018, she confirmed that she is currently in the process of writing a second solo record.

Albums

Studio albums

Singles

Music videos

Writing credits

References

Discographies of British artists
Pop music discographies